John Congleton is an American Grammy Award-winning record producer, engineer, mixer, writer and musician. 

In addition to his production work, Congleton has fronted the alternative rock band the Paper Chase, and writes music for a newer project entitled the Nighty Nite. He has also written music for various other projects, including MTV's Jackass, the Discovery Channel, Friday Night Lights, Evil Lives Here, and several Halloween sound effects/music CDs. 

In January 2016 it was announced that Congleton and the Nighty Nite would be releasing a full-length studio album on April 1 of that year.

Selected production work

Congleton has worked with the following musicians and groups.

Selected engineering work
 Dallas Symphony Orch. "A Dayful of Song"
 Kirk Franklin & the Family Kingdom "Come - O.S.T." 
 Prince of Egypt -" O.S.T."
 Bono (w/Kirk Franklin)  "Lean On Me"
 Nu Nation Project
 Jackie McCullough "This is for You, Lord" 
 The Roots w/Erykah Badu "You Got Me" (Single)
 MC Breed Let's "Go To the Club" 
 Modest Mouse Float on/Bukowski 
 Erykah Badu

(Allmusic)

Band member
Musically, Congleton is best known for being a founding member of the band The Paper Chase, an alternative rock band formed in Dallas, TX in 1998. The band was signed to Kill Rock Stars and Southern Records. Their albums "God Bless Your Black Heart" and "Now You Are One Of Us" have been released on vinyl by the Austrian label Trost Records.  Congleton produced all the band's material to date. He also wrote nearly all of the material, with a few exceptions.  Since the dissolution of The Paper Chase, he has formed The Nighty Nite with former Paper Chase bandmate Jason Garner.

References

Interviews and External links
2014 NPR All Songs Considered Interview and Guest DJ Session 
https://soundcloud.com/tapeopmagazine/tape-op-podcast-episode-13-john-congleton 
https://soundcloud.com/noisecreators/076-john-congleton-st-vincent-explosions-in-the-sky-blondie 
https://soundcloud.com/vinylemergency/episode-63-producer-john-congleton-the-paper-chase-the-nighty-nite 
https://songexploder.net/sharon-van-etten
reddit ask me anything w/john congleton
2011 NPR Interview
http://www.sonicscoop.com/2016/07/13/john-congleton-st-vincent-walkmen-part-1-recording-mixing-production-process/
consequence of sound interview 2015 "quest for truth in five records" 
conversation with john congleton and dave fridmann
2010 Tape Op Interview 
http://www.mixonline.com/news/profiles/wild-beasts-boy-king/427859
http://www.matadorreview.com/john-congleton
Interview with Fangoria 
http://www.15questions.net/interview/fifteen-questions-interview-john-congleton/page-1/
interview with audio technology magazine 
interview in sound on sound 
interview with baeble music 
tape op live interview by larry crane 
interview with radio.com
interview with Myspace
Interview gearwire
Interview - popmatters (August 2006)
punk planet interview
everything went black podcast interview
interview (regarding the nighty nite) 
d magazine interview about producing the walkmen 
d magazine interview 
Indieheads Podcast Interview
The Process Podcast Interview
Interview on Unstoppable Recording Machine
Interview on Never Meet Your idols

1977 births
Grammy Award winners
Living people
People from Lubbock, Texas
Record producers from Texas